AB III is the third studio album by the rock band Alter Bridge, released on October 8, 2010. Produced by Michael Baskette, the album is a departure from the band's first two albums; lyrically, it is a loose concept album dealing with darker lyrical themes of struggling with faith, while musically, the album's sound is more dynamic and progressive than previous recordings. AB III is also the first Alter Bridge album to be released on Roadrunner Records, making it the band's third consecutive album to be released on a different label. The album was released on Roadrunner Records worldwide except North America, where it was self-released on Alter Bridge Recordings via Capitol Records.

The first single off the album, "Isolation", is the band's most successful single to date and was released on September 26, 2010, in the United Kingdom and November 9, 2010 in the United States. AB III received acclaim from music critics; for example, Artistdirect called it a "masterpiece". The album was certified Silver by the British Phonographic Industry, the same certification as Alter Bridge's 2007 album Blackbird.

Background
AB III was written throughout 2008 and 2009, but the songs were arranged generally quickly. Regarding the arrangement and recording process of the album, lead singer Myles Kennedy said that the creation of AB III was different from that of the band's previous album, Blackbird, because the band had about six weeks to put the music together before they started to work with their producer, Michael Baskette. Kennedy said, "I think it actually worked out well, because it's a very spontaneous record."

On June 21, 2010, the band announced that the recording, mixing, and mastering of the album was finished and all that was left was to decide on was the official title, song titles, track listing, and album art. On August 9, 2010, the band announced that the working title of the album, AB III, would actually be the official title after all, stating they think it is "simple yet effective". On the same blog post, they announced each song on the record one by one throughout the day. Later that month it was confirmed that AB III would be released worldwide (excluding North America) on Roadrunner Records, making AB III Alter Bridge's third consecutive album to be released through a different record label. The same press release confirmed a European release date of October 11, 2010 for the new album. On October 6, the band announced that the album is scheduled for a North American release on November 9, 2010 on their own label, Alter Bridge Recordings, a subsidiary of Capitol Records. AB III was first released in Australia three years to the day after their previous album on October 8, 2010.

"Zero" and "Home" were included on the United States version of the album as bonus tracks. The Japanese version contains a bonus track called "Never Born to Follow". Guitarist Mark Tremonti said that AB III could be the band's final studio album and that future Alter Bridge releases may be released digitally or in the form of EPs.

On October 25, 2011, the band released a special edition of the album titled AB III.5, which included the three bonus tracks plus an hour-long documentary titled One by One.

Composition and lyrical content
AB III, initially described by the band as being very dark, heavy, and dynamic, is lyrically a very dark record and a radical departure from the band's first two albums, One Day Remains (2004) and Blackbird (2007), in terms of subject matter. It is a loose concept album, a first for Alter Bridge, about a character "desperately struggling to find their place in a world steeped in doubt and emptiness", whereas the other two Alter Bridge records primarily focus on themes of "hope and perseverance in the face of adversity". Kennedy has said that the album "touches on the thoughts and emotions of someone who has come to question everything that was once regarded as an absolute truth" and that it is about "the realization that everything you once believed in might not exist". However, on AB III, there are songs that touch on other emotions as well such as "Wonderful Life", a song that Kennedy claims was "an extremely emotional song to put together, it took a long time". He then adds, "The lyric was inspired by the idea that there will come a day when we all must say goodbye to the ones we love and hold dear in our hearts. Basically, I asked myself what would I want to say in that final moment, that last goodbye?".

The record is also much more intricate, progressive, and dynamic than their first two albums. It has even been described as progressive metal in some reviews.

Kennedy plays more lead guitar on this album than he does on Blackbird. He said that "[he's] definitely doing things [he hasn't] done in a long time as a guitar player." Tremonti's vocals are also more prominent compared to the band's previous releases, singing co-lead vocals with Kennedy on "Words Darker Than Their Wings", the title of which is derived from a phrase in George R. R. Martin's novel A Game of Thrones.

Reception and chart performance

AB III has received acclaim. Rob Laing from MusicRadar highly praised it and called it "one of the guitar albums of the year". Claudia Falzone from Outune.net, an Italian music website, also praised AB III and said that it "reveals another unpredictable side" to Alter Bridge, but that because of that, "the earliest fan could not welcome this record immediately" and that the record "will require more than one or two listenings to be appreciated and understood at your best." Petra Whiteley from Reflections of Darkness called AB III "impressive" and a "must-get", and stated that "the musicianship of this album is altogether honed to excellence." She also praised the band by saying that "they are more interested in making music and that authenticity of their art and integrity are more important to them than the commercial side of it." She later went on to say that Alter Bridge "will go far and shouldn't be missed out on." Rick Florino from Artistdirect gave the record an extremely positive review and a perfect 5 out of 5 score. He said that it is "one of the best rock records of 2010" and called it a "sprawling masterpiece that illuminates just how brilliant this band truly is" and "a juggernaut of an album that places the band firmly in the rock 'n' roll pantheon forever." He expanded on this in an interview with Myles Kennedy by calling the album "everything 21st century rock music should be" and saying that it will "establish this band among the most important in the genre." Entertainment Focus also reviewed the album positively, saying, "Overall this is a great album from the band that sees them all stepping up a notch." However, the reviewer noted that AB III will "test some listeners" and that "[f]ans of the previous two albums may find this one a bit more difficult to digest." The Contrapuntist called AB III "a grand achievement and possibly the best hard rock album of the year." Ultimate Guitar named AB III one of the best ten albums of the year 2010. However, not all reviews have been entirely positive. A reviewer from Type 3 Media said, "Overall AB III is a good effort, but it may not hold up to Alter Bridge's previous releases."

So far, AB III has performed better on the charts than any of the band's previous albums. On its first day, AB III reached the No. 1 rock album and No. 4 overall on the iTunes Store in Germany. In Australia, it reached the No. 2 rock album. On October 17, 2010, AB III reached No. 9 in the United Kingdom album charts and No. 1 in the rock album charts. AB III reached the No. 1 rock album, and No. 2 overall, on iTunes in the United States. For the week of November 27, 2010, the album reached No. 17 on the Billboard 200.

Singles
"Isolation" was released as the first single in September 2010. It generally received very positive reviews from the critics. It became the band's first ever song to top the Hot Mainstream Rock Tracks, for 7 weeks. It also topped the active rock charts. It peaked No. 5 position in the Billboard Rock Songs, No. 20 in the Billboard Alternative Songs. "I Know It Hurts" was released as the second single from the album for radio airplay worldwide except the U.S. "Ghost of Days Gone By" was the second in U.S. and third overall single, which was released in April 2011.

Track listing

Personnel
Alter Bridge
Myles Kennedy – vocals, rhythm and lead guitar
Mark Tremonti – lead and rhythm guitar, additional vocals, co-lead vocals on "Words Darker Than Their Wings"
Brian Marshall – bass
Scott Phillips – drums, percussion

Additional musicians
String arrangements by Michael Baskette and Dave Holdredge

Production
Michael Baskette – producer
Dave Holdredge – engineer
Brian Sperber – mixing
Ted Jensen – mastering
Daniel Tremonti – cover art
Jef Moll – digital editing
Tony Adams – drum technician

Release history

Certifications

Appearances
The song "Isolation" was featured in the video game Dirt 3 in 2011.

References

External links
 Official band website

2010 albums
Alter Bridge albums
Roadrunner Records albums
Albums produced by Michael Baskette